The Gros Ventre are a Native American people of Montana.

Gros Ventre may also refer to:

Gros Ventre language, the extinct language of the Gros Ventre people
Gros Ventre of the Missouri, an archaic term for the Hidatsa people

Places
 Gros Ventre Range
 Gros Ventre River
 Gros Ventre landslide
 Gros Ventre Wilderness